The 11.35 mm Schouboe or .45 Schouboe was an experimental centerfire pistol cartridge produced in 1902, used by the Schouboe Automatic Pistol.  The lightweight bullet was a steel jacketed wooden plug with an aluminum disk protecting the base.  Muzzle velocity was 1600 feet per second.  Accuracy was poor, and the blowback pistol chambered for this cartridge was unsuccessful.

References

Pistol and rifle cartridges